Jacques Pélissard (born March 20, 1946 in Lyon, Rhône) was a member of the National Assembly of France.  He represented Jura's 1st constituency, from 1993 to 2017 as a member of the Union for a Popular Movement. He worked as a professor of economic law at Emlyon Business School between 1971 and 1974.

Jacques Pélissard was part of the "Coppens commission" who prepared the French Charter for the Environment of 2004.

References

1946 births
Living people
Academic staff of Emlyon Business School
Politicians from Lyon
Union for a Popular Movement politicians
Deputies of the 12th National Assembly of the French Fifth Republic
Deputies of the 13th National Assembly of the French Fifth Republic
Deputies of the 14th National Assembly of the French Fifth Republic
Members of Parliament for Jura